The 2015 Florida Gators women's volleyball team represented the University of Florida volleyball program for the 2015 NCAA volleyball season.

Schedule

! style="background:#FF4A00;color:white;"| Regular Season
|- valign="top" 

|- bgcolor="#ffffff"
| August 29 || at James Madison || || Harrisonburg, VA || – ||  || – || 0–0
|- bgcolor="#ffffff"
| August 30 || at American || || Washington, DC || – ||  || – || 0–0
|-

|- bgcolor="#ffffff"
| September 4 || Oregon ||  || Austin, TX || – ||  || – || 0–0
|- bgcolor="#ffffff"
| September 5 || at Texas ||  || Austin, TX || – ||  || – || –
|- bgcolor="#ffffff"
| September 10 || Eastern Washington ||  || Honolulu, HI || – ||  || – || –
|- bgcolor="#ffffff"
| September 11 || at Hawaii || || Honolulu, HI || – ||  || – || –
|- bgcolor="#ffffff"
| September 12 || San Diego State || || Honolulu, HI || – ||  || – || –
|- bgcolor="#ffffff"
| September 17 || St. Johns || || Gainesville, FL || – ||  || – || –
|- bgcolor="#ffffff"
| September 20 || Florida State || || Gainesville, FL || – ||  || – || –
|- bgcolor="#ffffff"
| September 25 || Ole Miss || || Gainesville, FL || – ||  || – || –
|- bgcolor="#ffffff"
| September 27 || Kentucky || || Gainesville, FL|| – ||  || – || –
|- bgcolor="#ffffff"
| September 30 || at Missouri || || Columbia, MO || – ||  || – || –
|-

|- bgcolor="#ffffff"
| October 4|| at Arkansas || || Fayatteville, AR || – ||  || – || –
|- bgcolor="#ffffff"
| October 9|| Texas A&M || || Gainesville, FL || – ||  || – || –
|- bgcolor="#ffffff"
| October 11|| Auburn || || Gainesville, FL || – ||  || – || –
|- bgcolor="#ffffff"
| October 14|| at Tennessee || || Knoxville, TN || – ||  || – || –
|- bgcolor="#ffffff"
| October 18|| at Kentucky || || Lexington, KY || – ||  || – || –
|- bgcolor="#ffffff"
| October 23|| Arkansas || || Gainesville, FL || – ||  || – || –
|- bgcolor="#ffffff"
| October 25|| Missouri || || Gainesville, FL || – ||  || – || –
|- bgcolor="#ffffff"
| October 30|| at South Carolina || || Columbia, SC || – ||  || – || –
|-

|- bgcolor="#ffffff"
| October 4|| at Georgia || || Athens, GA || – ||  || – || –
|- bgcolor="#ffffff"
| October 9|| Mississippi State || || Gainesville, FL || – ||  || – || –
|- bgcolor="#ffffff"
| October 11|| at Auburn || || Auburn, AL || – ||  || – || –
|- bgcolor="#ffffff"
| October 14|| Alabama || || Gainesville, FL || – ||  || – || –
|- bgcolor="#ffffff"
| October 18|| Tennessee || || Gainesville, FL || – ||  || – || –
|- bgcolor="#ffffff"
| October 23|| at LSU || || Baton Rouge, LA || – ||  || – || –
|- bgcolor="#ffffff"
| October 25|| at Texas A&M || || College Station, TX || – ||  || – || –
|- bgcolor="#ffffff"
| October 30|| LIU Brooklyn || || Gainesville, FL || – ||  || – || –
|-

|-
! style="background:#FF4A00;color:white;"| Postseason
|-

References

Florida
Florida Gators women's volleyball seasons
Florida Gators volleyball